Kumbhkot is a census town in Kota district in the Indian state of Rajasthan.

Demographics
, according to the India census, Kumbhkot had a population of 5,857. Males constitute 58% of the population and females 42%. Kumbhkot has an average literacy rate of 44%, lower than the national average of 65%: male literacy is 62%, and female literacy is 24%. In Kumbhkot, 30% of the population is under 6 years of age.

As of 2011, according to the India census, Kumbhkot population had risen to 6,602. Males constitute 54% of the population and females 46%. Kumbhkot has an average literacy rate of 48%, still lower than the national average of 74%. Male literacy is 61%, and female literacy is 34%. 18.5% of the population is under 6 years of age.

References

Cities and towns in Kota district

U know the--
This area is a huge area.There are thousands of stone factories known as Kota Stone, a large number of people work in these factories from outside and the unemployed people around them also get employment, here Ramganjmandi is named as Daniya Mandi.  Known from